Jessica Litman is a leading intellectual property scholar. She has been ranked as one of the most-cited U.S. law professors in the field of intellectual property/cyberlaw.

Litman graduated from Reed College, received an MFA from Southern Methodist University, and received a JD from Columbia Law School.
 After law school, she served as a law clerk to Judge Betty Fletcher on the United States Court of Appeals for the Ninth Circuit.

She is John F. Nickoll Professor of Law at the University of Michigan Law School, after having been a law professor at Wayne State University Law School from 1990 to 2006 and University of Michigan Law from 1984 to 1990. She has also held a joint appointment as Professor of Information at the University of Michigan's School of Information, and has taught at schools including New York University and the University of Tokyo. Her original appointment to the  Michigan Law faculty was only the fourth to that faculty of a woman.

Litman is the author of Digital Copyright: Protecting Intellectual Property on the Internet (2001), a classic text exploring the events leading to the passage of the Digital Millennium Copyright Act. The book's third edition was published in open-access form in 2017. She is also the co-author, with Jane Ginsburg and Mary Lou Kevlin, of the casebook Trademarks and Unfair Competition Law: Cases and Materials. Google Scholar lists Litman as the author of more than eighty articles, book chapters, or shorter works, published in the Yale Law Journal, the Stanford Law Review, the Columbia Law Review, the Texas Law Review, and elsewhere.

Litman has testified before Congress multiple times, most recently in 2020. According to digital libraries expert Karen Coyle, Litman’s 1994 testimony before the Working Group on Intellectual Property of the White House Information Infrastructure Task Force “leapt from the page like some minor miracle of truth and justice.”

Litman is a recipient of Public Knowledge’s IP3 award, awarded each year for significant contribution to “Intellectual Property, Information Policy, [or] Internet Protocol.” She is an elected member of the American Law Institute and an adviser to that body’s Restatement of the Law, Copyright. She serves on the advisory board of Cyberspace Law Abstracts, and is a member of the International Advisory Board of I/S: A Journal of Law and Policy for the Information Society. She has served as a trustee of the Copyright Society of the U.S.A., as a member of the advisory councils of both Public Knowledge and the Future of Music Coalition, and as chair of the Association of American Law Schools Section on Intellectual Property. She served on the Intellectual Property and Internet Committee of the ACLU. She served on the Program Committee of the 13th Annual Conference on Computers, Freedom & Privacy, and the organizing committee of the 25th Telecommunications Policy Research Conference. She was a member of the National Research Council's Committee on Partnerships in Weather and Climate Services.

In 2021, Litman gave keynote speeches at conferences at Stanford and Cardozo law schools. 

Her brother, Harry Litman, is a lawyer, law professor, and political commentator.

Bibliography
 Digital Copyright: Protecting Intellectual Property on the Internet (2000)
 Trademark and Unfair Competition Law: Cases and Materials (2d ed. 1996 through 7th ed. 2022, with annual supplements), with Jane Ginsburg and Mary Lou Kevlin

References

External links

 Digital Copyright
 Interview with Litman at GrepLaw

Year of birth missing (living people)
Living people
American legal scholars
Copyright scholars
Reed College alumni
University of Michigan Law School faculty
Wayne State University faculty
Columbia Law School alumni
Southern Methodist University alumni
Creative Commons-licensed authors